Backus is a middle English surname deriving from the Old English bacan "to bake" and hus "house." It is believed to have originated in the north English historic counties of Cumberland and Durham.

People
Notable people with the surname include:

 A. E. Backus (1909–1990), American artist
 Azel Backus (1765–1816), first President of Hamilton College in New York
 Billy Backus (born 1943), former world boxing champion
 Edward Burdette Backus (1888–1955), American Unitarian minister and humanist
 Edward Wellington Backus (1861–1934), American timber baron
 Frederick F. Backus (1794–1858), American physician and member of the New York State Senate
 George Edward Backus (born 1930), American geophysicist
 Gus Backus (1937–2019), American singer
 Henny Backus (1911–2004), Broadway showgirl and wife of Jim Backus
 Henry T. Backus (1809–1877), American politician, Lieutenant Governor of Michigan and judge in Arizona Territory
 Isaac Backus (1724–1806), American Baptist preacher and politician
 Jan Backus (20th century), Vermont state senator
 Jeff Backus (born 1977), American professional football player
 Jim Backus (1913–1989), American actor
 John Backus (1924–2007), American computer scientist
 Samuel W. Backus, 19th-century American politician from California
 Sharron Backus (born 1946), American former softball player and coach
 Shea Backus (born 1975), American politician
 Winston Backus (born 1920), Canadian politician

See also
 Backusella, a genus of fungi named after the surname Backus, in honour of Professor M. P. Backus

References